Sisa Sklovská (born 13 October 1965) is a Slovak singer. She studied at Academy of Performing Arts in Bratislava (VŠMU) and subsequently joined the Slovak National Theatre, where she performed for five years as a soloist. Sklovská was among the judges for the X Factor (Czech and Slovak series). Slovak president Ivan Gašparovič attended her wedding to Juraj Lelkes in January 2011.

Discography

Studio albums
2000: Sisa
2003: Viem, čo chcem
2009: Kouzlem spoutaná
2010: Piesne vianočné (Christmas Songs) zlatá edícia
2010: Láska
2011: Pop Collection 2000–2010

References

External links

1965 births
Living people
People from Žilina
20th-century Slovak women opera singers
21st-century Slovak women opera singers